Samuel Milton "Golden Rule" Jones (1846–1904) was a Progressive-Era Mayor of Toledo, Ohio from 1897 until his death in 1904. Jones was famous for his outspoken advocacy of the proverbial ethic of reciprocity or "Golden Rule," hence his nickname.

Jones was a well-known eccentric advocate of municipal reform. He oversaw implementation of a series of humane modifications of the city of Toledo's administration during his tenure as mayor.

Early years

Samuel Milton Jones was born on August 3, 1846, at Tŷ-mawr near Beddgelert in Caernarvonshire, Wales. Jones' family was impoverished when Samuel was 3 years old, they immigrated to the United States in search of economic opportunity, winding up in central New York state.

Owing to the family's poverty, Jones was forced to work from a very young age and he received little formal education. After working for a time on his family's small farm, he left at age 14 to take work in a sawmill. From age 16 he began working summers aboard a steamship.

When he was 18, Jones made his way to Titusville, Pennsylvania to try to find work in the booming oil industry of Western Pennsylvania. He was initially unsuccessful there and he returned to New York the next year, where he found employment and managed to save up a modest sum of money over the next three years.

Business career 
Jones returned to Pennsylvania at the age of 22, where he began to speculatively invest his small nest egg in oil leases, from which he began to accumulate wealth. Jones then married,  had three children,and spent the next 15 years in the Pennsylvania oil industry.

Following the death of his wife and a child, Jones and his two surviving children left Pennsylvania for the oil fields of Ohio in 1886. It was there that he helped established the Ohio Oil Company, a firm which was later bought by Standard Oil Company, making Jones a wealthy man.

In 1892, Jones moved to Toledo, Ohio, the first time that he had lived in a large city. The next year, the Panic of 1893 erupted, with the United States into a depression and millions of individuals thrown into the grips of poverty. As a man of considerable wealth Jones was not himself personally affected by the misery around him — with an estimated 7,000 people in Lucas County, Ohio rendered indigent and the city of Toledo forced millions of dollars in debt — but he nevertheless seems to have been emotionally affected by the economic collapse.

Jones turned his talents to mechanical invention, obtaining a patent in 1894 for a new variety of iron pumping rod for deep well drilling. He opened a manufacturing plant in Toledo that same year for the manufacture of these so-called "sucker rods" for the oil industry — the Acme Sucker Rod Company. This marked a new career turn for Jones, from that of a mineral rights speculator and oil drilling operator to that of an employer of wage labor in a factory setting.

Jones made the decision to operate his new enterprise in accord with some of the emerging ideas about workplace reform. Whereas the prevailing wage in the depressed local economy stood at $1.00–$1.50  a day ($35–$53 in 2022), Jones paid his employees a living wage of $1.50 to $2.00 a day ($53–$70 in 2022). Jones implemented the 8-hour day for his workers and offered them paid vacation, revenue-sharing, and subsidized meals in a company cafeteria. Jones also contributed to workplace culture by paying for instruments for employees so that they could form a company band. Instead of a lengthy list of company regulations governing employee behavior, Acme Sucker Rod posted only one rule on the company notice board: "The golden rule: Do unto others as you would do unto yourself."

Jones's largesse in the face of general misery grew to legendary proportions among residents of Toledo and he earned the popular moniker "Golden Rule" Jones.

Mayor of Toledo 

In 1897 Jones received the Republican nomination for mayor of Toledo. Workers liked his golden rule policy and united behind him, and he won the mayoral election. He strove to improve conditions for the working class of his community. 

Again based on his belief in the Golden Rule, Jones: 
 opened free kindergartens 
 developed a park system
 established playgrounds for children
 established free public baths
 instituted an eight-hour day for city workers
 took away truncheons from the police
 refused to enforce blue laws 
 reformed the city government

These policies made Jones unpopular with the Toledo's business community and his tolerance of saloons caused him to lose the support of many moral reformers. When his term was over in 1899, Jones was not re-nominated by the Republicans. He ran as an independent instead under the slogan "Principle Before Party" winning a second term with 70 percent of the vote. He was re-elected in 1901 with 57% of the vote and again in 1903 with 48% of the vote in a three-way race.

Progressive journalist and lawyer Brand Whitlock, who succeeded Jones as mayor, portrayed Jones as almost lighthearted in his approach to reform, especially when upsetting norms observed by the police:[H]e was most in his element when the police judge was absent, as he was now and then. In that exigency the law gave Jones, as mayor, the power to appoint the acting police judge; and when Jones did not go down and sit as magistrate himself, he appointed me; and we always found some reason or other for letting all the culprits go.Police frustration with Jones led the Ohio General Assembly, which Republicans dominated, to enact a statute taking control of the Toledo police department away from the mayor and giving it instead to a commission appointed by the governor.  In 1902, however, the Ohio Supreme Court struck the statute down as violative of the Ohio Constitution after Jones mounted a legal challenge.

"Golden Rule" Jones died suddenly during his third term as mayor on July 12, 1904. Citizens of Toledo lined the streets to view his funeral procession. His successor, Brand Whitlock, continued Jones' reform efforts. Whitlock's 1914 autobiography, Forty Years of It, contains an extended, admiring discussion of Jones.

A 1993 survey of historians, political scientists and urban experts conducted by Melvin G. Holli of the University of Illinois at Chicago saw Jones ranked as the fifth-best American big-city mayor to serve between the years 1820 and 1993.

Legacy 

Jones was a Christian Socialist. He was influenced by Henry George, but argued in his 1899 book:

But, because of Jones's iconoclasm, the Socialist Party of his day "disowned him, and were at one with the capitalists in their hatred and abuse of him." According to historian Robert M. Crunden, Jones was

In his will, Jones left a "Golden Rule Trust" to the workers in his factory for $10,000 (over $328,400 in 2022).

See also

 List of mayors of Toledo, Ohio

Footnotes

Further reading
 Boase, Paul H. "Samuel M.(Golden Rule) Jones: Unorthodox Champion of Free Speech." Free Speech Yearbook 19.1 (1980): 32–39.
 Bremner, Robert H. The Civic Revival in Ohio: Samuel M. Jones: The Man without a Party," American Journal of Economics and Sociology, 8#2 (Jan. 1949), pp. 151–161. onlineIn JSTOR
 Bremner, Robert H. "The Civic Revival in Ohio: Police, Penal and Parole Policies in Cleveland and Toledo," American Journal of Economics and Sociology, vol. 14, no. 4 (July 1955), pp. 387–398. In JSTOR
 Crosby, Ernest Howard. Golden Rule Jones: Mayor of Toledo (1906) online.
  Crunden, Robert M. "Jones, Samuel Milton" in John A. Garraty, Encyclopedia of American Biography (1974) pp. 600-601.
 DeMatteo, Arthur E. "The Progressive as Elitist:‘Golden Rule’Jones and the Toledo Charter Reform Campaign of 1901." Northwest Ohio Quarterly 69.1 (1997): 8-30.
 Frederick, Peter J. Knights of the Golden Rule: The Intellectual As Christian Social Reformer in the 1890s. Lexington, KY: University Press Of Kentucky, 1976.
 Jones, Marnie. Holy Toledo: Religion and Politics in the Life of "Golden Rule" Jones. Lexington, KY: University Press of Kentucky, 1998.
 Jones, Marnie. "Writing Great-Grandfather's Biography," The American Scholar, vol. 56, no. 4 (Autumn 1987), pp. 519–534. In JSTOR

External links
 "Samuel M. Jones," Ohio History Central online encyclopedia, www.ohiohistorycentral.org/
 

1846 births
1904 deaths
Mayors of Toledo, Ohio
American Christian socialists
Ohio socialists
Businesspeople from Toledo, Ohio
19th-century American politicians
20th-century American politicians